Reales Atarazanas (Spanish for Royal Shipyards) may refer to

 Reales Atarazanas (Barcelona), shipyards in Barcelona, Spain
 Reales Atarazanas (Santo Domingo), shipyards in Santo Domingo, Dominican Republic
 Reales Atarazanas (Seville), shipyards in Seville, Spain